Fred Perry defeated Jack Crawford 6–3, 7–5, 6–1 in the final to win the men's singles tennis title at the 1934 Australian Championships.

Seeds
The seeded players are listed below. Fred Perry is the champion; others show the round in which they were eliminated.

 Jack Crawford (finalist)
 Fred Perry (champion)
 Vivian McGrath (semifinals)
 Adrian Quist (semifinals)
 Harry Hopman (quarterfinals)
 Harry Lee (quarterfinals)
 Patrick Hughes (quarterfinals)
 Edgar Moon (quarterfinals)

Draw

Key
 Q = Qualifier
 WC = Wild card
 LL = Lucky loser
 r = Retired

Finals

Earlier rounds

Section 1

Section 2

Section 3

Section 4

External links
 

1934
1934 in Australian tennis
Men's Singles